Carletto is a given name, nickname and surname.

Nickname
Carletto, nickname of Carlo Ancelotti (born 1959), Italian former football player and manager
Carletto, nickname of Carlo Caliari (1570–1596), Italian artist
Carletto, nickname of Carlo Mazzone (born 1937), Italian football player and manager
Carletto Sposito, stagename of Carlo Sposito (1924 – 1984), Italian actor

Surname
Piero Carletto (born 1963), Italian rower

Fictional characters
Carletto, character in 1974 Italian film, All Screwed Up

See also

Carlotto (name)
Carlette (given name)
Gianpietro Carlesso
Thiago Carleto

Lists of people by nickname